|}

This is a list of electoral district results for the Victorian 1955 election.

Results by electoral district

Albert Park

Ascot Vale

Ballarat North

Ballarat South

Balwyn

Benalla

Benambra

Bendigo

Box Hill

Brighton

Broadmeadows

Brunswick East

Brunswick West

Burwood

Camberwell

Carlton

Caulfield

Caulfield East

Coburg

Collingwood

Dandenong

Dundas

Elsternwick

Evelyn

Flemington

Footscray

Geelong

Geelong West

Gippsland East

Gippsland South

Gippsland West

Grant

Hampden

Hawthorn

Ivanhoe

Kara Kara

Kew

Lowan

Malvern

Melbourne

Mentone

Midlands

Mildura

Moonee Ponds

Moorabbin

Mornington

Morwell

Murray Valley

Northcote

Oakleigh

Pascoe Vale

Polwarth

Portland

Port Melbourne

Prahran

Preston

Reservoir

Richmond

Ripponlea

Rodney

St Kilda

Sandringham

Scoresby

Swan Hill

Toorak

Williamstown

See also 

 1955 Victorian state election
 Members of the Victorian Legislative Assembly, 1955–1958

References 

Results of Victorian state elections
1955 in Victoria (Australia)